Andrea Crespo (born 1993, Miami) is an American artist based in New York city. They earned their BFA from Pratt Institute in 2015. Their solo exhibition, Andrea Crespo: virocrypsis, at the Swiss Institute of Contemporary Art was featured in the February 2016 issue of Artforum.

Their work is included in the Rubell Family Collection, the Fondation Louis-Vuitton and in the Zabludowicz Collection.

Crespo explores the complex cultural and historical narratives that surround the wrong forms of the psychological and bodily being. Identity or identity errors encompassed his practice, although they have also focused on the interconnectedness of psychopathological realities, cultural formations, and the digital communities associated with them.

Solo exhibitions 
2019 Step Right Up, Kraupa-Tuskany Zeidler, Berlin

2017 [intensifies], Kraupa-Tuskany Zeidler, Berlin

2017 Joined for Life, Downs & Ross, New York

2017 List Projects: Andrea Crespo, MIT List Visual Arts Center, Cambridge, MA

2016 A day in the lives of, New Museum/Rhizome (online), New York

References

Living people
1993 births
Artists from Miami
Artists from New York City
Pratt Institute alumni